, also referred to as , is a constituency of the House of Representatives in the Diet of Japan. It is located in southwestern Hyōgo and consists of the city of Amagasaki. As of September 2015, 379,207 eligible voters were registered in the district. It is one of the 48 districts in the Kansai region that form the Kinki proportional representation block.

The district was established as part of the electoral reform of 1994; the area was previously part of Hyōgo 2nd district that elected five representatives by single non-transferable vote.

Since the district's creation, it has been represented by three people: former Minister of Land, Infrastructure and Transport Tetsuzo Fuyushiba, former governor of Nagano Prefecture Yasuo Tanaka, and the current representative Hiromasa Nakano, who worked under Fuyushiba in the Ministry of Land, Infrastructure and Transport.

List of representatives

Election results

References 

Districts of the House of Representatives (Japan)